Forbes compiles the finances of all 32 NFL teams to produce an annual ranking of the best franchises in terms of valuation. The valuations are composed of the monetary worth of the sport, market, stadium deals, and brand. These areas are supported by applying financial metrics such as debt and operating income to each one.

The latest ranking reported that the Dallas Cowboys is the most valuable NFL franchise after the 2021 NFL season. The fastest growing NFL franchise is the Buffalo Bills, with a 112.5% increase in valuation since the 2017 NFL season ($1.6 to $3.4 billion). The Cowboys have held the title for the highest valuation since the 2007 NFL season, two seasons after the ranking began publishing.

Several media outlets have referenced in related news or conducts analytic journalism when the ranking comes out, such as CBS and Sports Illustrated. The NFL has recognized the annual ranking for the first time after the rendition based on the 2014 NFL season. The report has also applied more context to NFL trends, such as the financial impact of Tom Brady signing with the Tampa Bay Buccaneers. The signage has widely contributed to the franchise being the fastest growing within a year, with 29% as its 1-year increase from 2019 ($2.3 billion) to 2020 ($2.94 billion).

Ranking
Rankings as of August 22, 2022 (2021 NFL season)

Composition

Historical valuations

Notes

See also

 Forbes' list of the most valuable sports teams
 List of professional sports leagues by revenue

References

National Football League
Sports rankings
Top sports lists
Forbes lists
21st century-related lists